The flag of San Diego consists of three vertical bands; colored from left to right; dark red, white and gold. The central white band carries the city seal, which carries the words: "The City of San Diego · State of California · Semper Vigilans." The last of those three phrases is the city's official motto, Latin for "ever vigilant." Under the seal is the number 1542, the year in which Juan Rodríguez Cabrillo first entered San Diego Bay and claimed the area for the Spanish Empire. The red and gold bands come from the colors of Spain's flag.
The flag was adopted on October 16, 1934 by the City Council, after Albert V. Mayrhofer submitted a sample banner on behalf of the California Historical Association, the Native Sons of the Golden West, Native Daughters of the Golden West, and The San Diegans.

References

External links

Flags of the World

Flag
Flags of cities in California
Flags introduced in 1934
1934 establishments in California